The following highways are numbered 152:

Canada
 Prince Edward Island Route 152

Costa Rica
 National Route 152

India
 National Highway 152 (India)

Japan
 Japan National Route 152

United States
 U.S. Route 152 (former)
 Alabama State Route 152
 Arkansas Highway 152
 California State Route 152
 Connecticut Route 152
 Florida State Road 152
 Georgia State Route 152
 Illinois Route 152
 Indiana State Road 152
 Iowa Highway 152
 K-152 (Kansas highway)
 Kentucky Route 152
 Louisiana Highway 152
 Maine State Route 152
 Maryland Route 152
 Massachusetts Route 152
 M-152 (Michigan highway)
 Minnesota State Highway 152
 Missouri Route 152
 New Hampshire Route 152
 New Jersey Route 152
 New Mexico State Road 152
 New York State Route 152 (former)
 North Carolina Highway 152
 Ohio State Route 152
 Oklahoma State Highway 152
 Pennsylvania Route 152
 Rhode Island Route 152
 Tennessee State Route 152
 Texas State Highway 152
 Texas State Highway Spur 152
 Utah State Route 152
 Virginia State Route 152
 West Virginia Route 152
 Wisconsin Highway 152
 Wyoming Highway 152
Territories
 Puerto Rico Highway 152
 Puerto Rico Highway 152R